Deborah Patricia Watling (2 January 1948 – 21 July 2017) was an English actress who played the role of Victoria Waterfield, a companion of the Second Doctor in the BBC television series Doctor Who from 1967 to 1968. She began her career as a child actress, making her debut as a regular in The Invisible Man (1958-1959). Watling is also well known for starring in the films Take Me High (1973) with Cliff Richard and That'll Be the Day (1973) with David Essex as well as playing Julie Robertson in The Newcomers (1969) and Norma Baker in Danger UXB (1979) on television.

Early life
Deborah was born at the Queen Charlotte's and Chelsea Hospital in London the daughter of actors Jack Watling and Patricia Hicks. Her brother Giles and her half-sister, Dilys, are also actors. She was raised in Epping until the family moved to the 16th-century Alderton Hall in Loughton, Essex. Educated at Braeside School in Buckhurst Hill, Watling considered becoming a dentist before enrolling at the Italia Conti Stage School. Watling made her film debut aged three and started playing background roles in her father's films. During one of her half-sister's parties, Watling started talking to a boy who turned out to be Michael Craze who she would take over from as a companion in Doctor Who many years later.

Career
Beginning as a child actress, Watling had a regular role as the niece of Peter Brady in The Invisible Man (1958) television series. She was later cast for the lead role in Alice (1965), Dennis Potter's play about Lewis Carroll and Alice Liddell, for the BBC's The Wednesday Play, a small role in That'll Be the Day (1973) and as Norma Baker in the ITV series Danger UXB (1979). She also co-starred with Cliff Richard in the 1973 film Take Me High. She also made many theatre appearances throughout her career.

According to the short BBC Video documentary The Dalek Factor about the making of the story, released in September 2021 as part of the animated restoration of the serial, Denise Buckley was cast in the role of Victoria Waterfield by director Derek Martinus. The production team had been hoping that Pauline Collins would continue in the role of Samantha Briggs, that she had played in the previous story The Faceless Ones, but had created Victoria as a potential ongoing character should Collins decline. When Collins confirmed she did not want to join the regular cast, it was decided to introduce Victoria as the new companion and Denise Buckley was released, but paid in full, with Deborah Watling replacing her as a more suitable actress for the continuing role. Watling played Victoria in Doctor Who from 1967 to 1968, though owing to the BBC's wiping policy of the time, The Tomb of the Cybermen (1967) and The Enemy of the World (1967–1968) are the only serials in which she appeared that still exist in their entirety. She also appeared in Dimensions in Time (1993) and Downtime (1995).

Watling also appeared in the Doctor Who audio drama Three's a Crowd and regularly attended Doctor Who conventions and events. In November 2013, she appeared in the one-off 50th anniversary comedy homage The Five(ish) Doctors Reboot.

Personal life
In her later years, Watling lived with her husband in Thorpe-le-Soken, Essex where she was a well known figure in the village and regularly used her acting experience by directing the local pantomimes.

Her autobiography, entitled Daddy’s Girl, was published in 2010.

Death
She died on 21 July 2017 at Beaumont Manor nursing home in Frinton-on-Sea, six weeks after being diagnosed with lung cancer.

Filmography

Film

Television

Audio dramas

References

External links

Deborah Watling's official website (archived)
BBC Norfolk Online – RealAudio interview from the Holt Doctor Who Midsummer Invasion 2006
Deborah Watling(Aveleyman)

1948 births
2017 deaths
English television actresses
20th-century English actresses
Actresses from Buckinghamshire
People from Loughton
Actresses from Essex
21st-century English actresses
English child actresses
Deaths from lung cancer in England
20th-century British businesspeople